East Troy is a Village in Walworth County, Wisconsin, United States. The population was 5,673 at the 2020 census. The Village is located southwest of the Town of East Troy. A small portion extends into the adjacent Town of Troy.

Geography
East Troy is located at  (42.7868, -88.4036).

Demographics

2010 census
As of the census of 2010, there were 4,281 people, 1,737 households, and 1,125 families living in the village. The racial makeup of the village was 95.9% White, 0.4% African American, 0.5% Native American, 0.6% Asian, 0.1% Pacific Islander, 1.1% from other races, and 1.4% from two or more races. Hispanic or Latino of any race were 4.0% of the population.

There were 1,737 households, of which 35.7% had children under the age of 18 living with them, 48.6% were married couples living together, 11.1% had a female householder with no husband present, 5.1% had a male householder with no wife present, and 35.2% were non-families. 29.2% of all households were made up of individuals, and 10.9% had someone living alone who was 65 years of age or older. The average household size was 2.44 and the average family size was 3.04.

The median age in the village was 36.1 years. 27% of residents were under the age of 18; 7.4% were between the ages of 18 and 24; 28.1% were from 25 to 44; 25.4% were from 45 to 64; and 12% were 65 years of age or older. The gender makeup of the village was 49.1% male and 50.9% female.

2000 census
At the 2000 census, there were 3,564 people, 1,350 households and 984 families living in the village. The population density was 986.6 per square mile (381.2/km2). There were 1,396 housing units at an average density of 386.4 per square mile (149.3/km2). The racial makeup of the village was 96.77% White, 0.17% Black or African American, 0.28% Native American, 0.53% Asian, 1.35% from other races, and 0.90% from two or more races. 2.95% of the population were Hispanic or Latino of any race.

There were 1,350 households, of which 37.6% had children under the age of 18 living with them, 59.5% were married couples living together, 9.6% had a female householder with no husband present, and 27.1% were non-families. 22.6% of all households were made up of individuals, and 9.8% had someone living alone who was 65 years of age or older. The average household size was 2.60 and the average family size was 3.07.

27.9% of the population were under the age of 18, 7.1% from 18 to 24, 32.3% from 25 to 44, 19.5% from 45 to 64, and 13.3% who were 65 years of age or older. The median age was 35 years. For every 100 females, there were 94.6 males. For every 100 females age 18 and over, there were 92.2 males.

The median household income was $48,397, and the median family income was $54,422. Males had a median income of $38,975 versus $25,179 for females. The per capita income for the village was $21,590. About 2.8% of families and 2.3% of the population were below the poverty line, including 2.4% of those under age 18 and 2.8% of those age 65 or over.

Transportation 
East Troy is served by the East Troy Municipal Airport, .

Attractions
 East Troy Electric Railroad Museum
 Alpine Valley Music Theatre
 Alpine Valley Ski Hill
 East Troy Bluegrass Festival
 Skydive Milwaukee - Sky Knights Sport Parachute Club
 East Troy Skatepark

Notable people

 Les Aspin, Congressman who lived in East Troy while in office.
 Alexander O. Babcock, Wisconsin State Representative
 Erik Buell, founder of Erik Buell Racing
 Eugene W. Chafin, Prohibition Party candidate for President of the United States
 Richard A. Flintrop, Wisconsin State Representative
 Sidney Clayton Goff, Wisconsin State Representative
 Gaylord Graves, Wisconsin State Representative
 Annie Haeger, Olympic sailor
 Lorena Hickok, journalist, friend of Eleanor Roosevelt
 Isabella Hofmann, actress
 Cody Horlacher, Wisconsin State Representative and lawyer
 Maxine Hough, Wisconsin State Assemblywomen
 Myrtle E. Johnson, marine biologist
 Mark W. Neumann, U.S. Representative
 Jared James Nichols, blues guitarist
 John F. Potter, member of the U.S. House of Representatives from Wisconsin (1857–1863)
 Clifford E. Randall, U.S. Representative
 Stevie Ray Vaughan, the blues guitarist, died in a helicopter crash following a concert at Alpine Valley in 1990.
 Harriet G. R. Wright, Colorado state representative

References

External links
 East Troy Official Website
 East Troy Chamber of Commerce
 East Troy Electric Railroad Museum
 East Troy Bluegrass Festival
 Sanborn fire insurance maps: 1894 1900 1912

Villages in Wisconsin
Villages in Walworth County, Wisconsin